The Mixed duet free routine competition at the 2017 World Championships was held on 21 and 22 July 2017.

Results
The preliminary round was started on 21 July at 19:00. The final was held on 22 July at 19:00.

Green denotes finalists

References

Mixed duet free routine
World Aquatics Championships